Calophyllum peekelii is a species of flowering plant in the Calophyllaceae family. It is found in Indonesia, Papua New Guinea, and Solomon Islands.

References

peekelii
Trees of Papuasia
Least concern plants
Taxonomy articles created by Polbot